Best Always is the nineteenth studio album released by American country artist Crystal Gayle. The album was released in 1993 on Branson Entertainment and was co-produced by Gayle as well. The album was her first to be released on an independent label and contained cover versions of songs recorded by others.

Background
During the early 1990s, Crystal Gayle had been recording for the major labels Capitol and Liberty Records. After 1992, she departed from these labels and began recording for smaller labels. The first independent label she recorded under was Branson Entertainment, which Best Always was released through. The album contained cover versions of songs Gayle had previously recorded. Examples of this included Gayle's former hits from 1970s and 80s, "When I Dream" and "Ready for the Times to Get Better". Best Always also featured cover versions of songs Gayle had not yet recorded. Among these were "Crazy" by Patsy Cline and Irving Berlin's "Always".

Critical reception and release
The album received 2 out of 5 stars from Allmusic.

Best Always was officially released in July 1993 via Branson Entertainment. The album was released in both cassette and compact disc versions. In later editions, the album was released via Southpaw Music Productions.

Track listing

Personnel
All credits are adapted from Allmusic.

Musicians
 Charles Cochran – piano, keyboards
 Jim Ferguson – background vocals
 Crystal Gayle – background vocals, lead vocals
 Chris Leuzinger – acoustic guitar, electric guitar
 Mike Loudermilk – acoustic guitar, electric guitar
 Kenny Malone – percussion
 Duncan Mullins – bass
 Tony Newman – drums
 Jay Patten – acoustic guitar, mandolin, saxophone
 Dean Slocum – piano, keyboards
 Buddy Spicher – fiddle, viola

Creative
 Ron Keith – photography
 Kent Wells – design
Technical
 John "JD" Dickson – engineer
 John Donegan – producer
 Crystal Gayle – producer
 Ronnie Light – engineer
 Paula Montondo – assistant engineer
 Joe Scalfe – engineer
 David Sinko – engineer
 Jay Patten – producer
 Steve Tillisch – mixing

References

1993 albums
Crystal Gayle albums
Albums produced by Crystal Gayle